Tale of the Woods is a 1926 silent film directed by Yuri Tarich.

Plot 
The film tells about the adventures of a young scout Grishka and his friend - the daughter of a forester, who helps partisans in the fight against the occupiers.

Starring 
 Leonid Danilov as Grishka (as L. Danilov)
 T. Kotelnikova as Gelka
 Ivan Klyukvin as Andrey
 Mstislav Kotelnikov as Stepan
 L. Dedintsev as Yastrzhemskiy (as A. Dedintsev)
 Vladimir Korsh as Adjutant
 P. Rozhitsky as Zhabinskiy
 Sergey Borisov as Wachtmeister
 Klavdia Chebyshyova as Housekeeper
 Galina Kravchenko as Vanda
 Vassiliy Makarov as Forester
 A. Otradin as Levon
 Nikolai Vitovtov as Adjutant General
 Aleksandr Zhukov as Kazyuk

References

External links 
 

1926 films
1920s Russian-language films
Soviet silent feature films
Soviet black-and-white films